Rory O'Brien (born 2 June 1989) is an Australian former professional rugby league footballer who played in the 2000s and 2010s. He previously played for the St. George Illawarra Dragons.

Background
Born in Sydney, New South Wales, O'Brien is of Māori and Irish descent and played his junior football for Hurstville United, before being signed by the St. George Illawarra Dragons.

Playing career

Early career
In 2008, O'Brien played for the St. George Illawarra Dragons' NYC team, before giving up the game in early 2009. In 2013, he took up rugby league again, playing with the Collegians in the Illawarra Rugby League and winning the 2013 Country Rugby League Player of the Year award along with former Newcastle Knights, Sydney Roosters and Gold Coast Titans player Riley Brown. In October 2013, he played for the New South Wales Country Residents team that toured South Africa. In 2014, he joined the Illawarra Cutters in the New South Wales Cup. On 26 June 2014, he signed a -year contract to return to the St. George Illawarra Dragons effective immediately.

2015
In round 1 of the 2015 NRL season, O'Brien made his NRL debut for St. George against the Melbourne Storm. On 26 August, he signed a 1-year contract with the Parramatta Eels starting in 2016, after being released from the final year of his Saints contract.

2016
In round 14 of the 2016 season, O'Brien made his debut for Parramatta against the Gold Coast Titans. In August, he re-signed with Parramatta on a contract until the end of the 2017 season.

2017
O'Brien played two games for Parramatta in the 2017 season.  In the opening round against Manly and then the following week against St George.  O'Brien spent the rest of the season playing for the Wentworthville Magpies in the Intrust Super Premiership NSW.  On 29 November 2017, it was revealed that O'Brien's contract with Parramatta was not renewed and he was released by the club.

References

External links
St. George Illawarra Dragons profile

1989 births
Living people
Australian rugby league players
Australian people of Māori descent
New Zealand Māori rugby league players
St. George Illawarra Dragons players
Parramatta Eels players
Illawarra Cutters players
Rugby league players from Sydney
Rugby league props
People educated at Endeavour Sports High School
Wentworthville Magpies players